Isaac ben Meir (c. 1090 – c. 1130), also known as the Rivam after his Hebrew acronym, was a French rabbi and one of the Baalei Tosafos.

Biography
He was born in the French country village of Ramerupt, in the Aube département of northern France to Meir ben Shmuel and Yocheved, the daughter of Rashi. He was the grandson of Rashi, and brother of the Rashbam and the Rabbeinu Tam. He died before his father, leaving four children.

Although he died young, the Rivam contributed to Tosafot, mentioned by Eliezer ben Joel HaLevi, to several tractates of the Talmud. He is often quoted in the edited Tosafot.

References

Further reading
The Rishonim'', published by Artscroll,  (contains short biographies of the Rishonim including the Rivam)

12th-century French  rabbis
1090s births
1130s deaths
French Tosafists